The House of Donà, also known as Donato, are an old patrician  family in Venice, which produced at least three Doges. 

Members  include
Francesco Donà: 79th Doge (1545–1553)
Leonardo Donà: 90th Doge (1606–1612)
Nicolo Donà: 93rd Doge (April 10 – May 9, 1618) 

The family had owned various properties, including:
Palazzo Donà
Palazzo Donà Balbi
Palazzo Donà Giovannelli
Palazzo Donà-Ottobon

Republic of Venice families
Italian noble families